Goggia incognita is a species of gecko. It is endemic to the Western Cape, South Africa.

References

Goggia
Reptiles described in 2017
Endemic reptiles of South Africa